The Aerojet Rocketdyne RS-25, also known as the Space Shuttle Main Engine (SSME), is a liquid-fuel cryogenic rocket engine that was used on NASA's Space Shuttle and is currently used on the Space Launch System (SLS).

Designed and manufactured in the United States by Rocketdyne (later Pratt & Whitney Rocketdyne and Aerojet Rocketdyne), the RS-25 burns cryogenic liquid hydrogen and liquid oxygen propellants, with each engine producing  thrust at liftoff. Although RS-25 heritage traces back to the 1960s, its concerted development began in the 1970s with the first flight, STS-1, on April 12, 1981. The RS-25 has undergone upgrades over its operational history to improve the engine's reliability, safety, and maintenance load.

The Space Shuttle used a cluster of three RS-25 engines mounted at the stern of the orbiter, with fuel drawn from the external tank. The engines were used for propulsion throughout the spacecraft ascent, with total thrust increased by two solid rocket boosters and the orbiter's two AJ10 orbital maneuvering system engines.  Following each flight, the RS-25 engines were removed from the orbiter, inspected, refurbished, and then reused on another mission. On Space Launch System flights, the engines are expended. For the first four flights, engines left over from the Space Shuttle program will be refurbished and used before NASA switches to the simplified RS-25E variant.

Components 

The RS-25 engine consists of pumps, valves, and other components working in concert to produce thrust. Fuel (liquid hydrogen) and oxidizer (liquid oxygen) from the Space Shuttle's external tank entered the orbiter at the umbilical disconnect valves and from there flowed through the orbiter's main propulsion system (MPS) feed lines; whereas in the Space Launch System (SLS), fuel and oxidizer from the rocket's core stage will flow directly into the MPS lines. Once in the MPS lines, the fuel and oxidizer each branch out into separate paths to each engine (three on the Space Shuttle, four on the SLS). In each branch, pre-valves then allow the propellants to enter the engine.

Once in the engine, the propellants flow through low-pressure fuel and oxidizer turbopumps (LPFTP and LPOTP), and from there into high-pressure turbopumps (HPFTP and HPOTP). From these HPTPs the propellants take different routes through the engine. The oxidizer is split into four separate paths: to the oxidizer heat exchanger, which then splits into the oxidizer tank pressurization and pogo suppression systems; to the low-pressure oxidizer turbopump (LPOTP); to the high-pressure oxidizer pre-burner, from which it is split into the HPFTP turbine and HPOTP before being reunited in the hot gas manifold and sent on to the main combustion chamber (MCC); or directly into the main combustion chamber (MCC) injectors.

Meanwhile, fuel flows through the main fuel valve into regenerative cooling systems for the nozzle and MCC, or through the chamber coolant valve. The fuel passing through the MCC cooling system then passes back through the LPFTP turbine before being routed either to the fuel tank pressurization system or to the hot gas manifold cooling system (from where it passes into the MCC). Fuel in the nozzle cooling and chamber coolant valve systems is then sent via pre-burners into the HPFTP turbine and HPOTP before being reunited again in the hot gas manifold, from where it passes into the MCC injectors. Once in the injectors, the propellants are mixed and injected into the main combustion chamber where they are ignited. The ejection of the burning propellant mixture through the throat and bell of the engine's nozzle creates the thrust.

Turbopumps

Oxidizer system
The low-pressure oxidizer turbopump (LPOTP) is an axial-flow pump which operates at approximately 5,150 rpm driven by a six-stage turbine powered by high-pressure liquid oxygen from the high-pressure oxidizer turbopump (HPOTP). During engine operation, the pressure boost permits the high-pressure oxidizer turbine to operate at high speeds without cavitating.

Then, mounted before the HPOTP, is the pogo oscillation suppression system accumulator. A number of baffles of various types are present inside the accumulator to control sloshing and turbulence, which is useful of itself and also to prevent the escape of gas into the low-pressure oxidizer duct to be ingested in the HPOTP.

The HPOTP consists of two single-stage centrifugal pumps (the main pump and a pre-burner pump) mounted on a common shaft and driven by a two-stage, hot-gas turbine. The HPOTP discharge flow splits into several paths, one of which drives the LPOTP turbine. Another path is to, and through, the main oxidizer valve and enters the main combustion chamber. Another small flow path is tapped off and sent to the oxidizer heat exchanger. The liquid oxygen flows through an anti-flood valve that prevents it from entering the heat exchanger until sufficient heat is present for the heat exchanger to utilize the heat contained in the gases discharged from the HPOTP turbine, converting the liquid oxygen to gas. The gas is sent to a manifold and then routed to pressurize the liquid oxygen tank. Another path enters the HPOTP second-stage pre-burner pump to boost the liquid oxygen's pressure from 30 to 51 MPa (4,300 psia to 7,400 psia). It passes through the oxidizer pre-burner oxidizer valve into the oxidizer pre-burner and through the fuel pre-burner oxidizer valve into the fuel pre-burner. It is attached by flanges to the hot-gas manifold.

The HPOTP turbine and HPOTP pumps are mounted on a common shaft. Mixing of the fuel-rich hot gases in the turbine section and the liquid oxygen in the main pump can create a hazard and, to prevent this, the two sections are separated by a cavity that is continuously purged by the engine's helium supply during engine operation. Two seals minimize leakage into the cavity; one seal is located between the turbine section and the cavity, while the other is between the pump section and cavity. Loss of helium pressure in this cavity results in automatic engine shutdown.

Fuel system
The low-pressure fuel turbopump (LPFTP) is an axial-flow pump driven by a two-stage turbine powered by gaseous hydrogen. It boosts the pressure of the liquid hydrogen from 30 to 276 psia (0.2 to 1.9 MPa) and supplies it to the high-pressure fuel turbopump (HPFTP). During engine operation, the pressure boost provided by the LPFTP permits the HPFTP to operate at high speeds without cavitating. It is connected to the vehicle propellant ducting and is supported in a fixed position by being mounted to the launch vehicle's structure.

The HPFTP is a three-stage centrifugal pump driven by a two-stage hot-gas turbine. It boosts the pressure of the liquid hydrogen from 1.9 to 45 MPa (276 to 6,515 psia), and operates at approximately 35,360 rpm with a power of 71,140 hp. The discharge flow from the turbopump is routed to, and through, the main valve and is then split into three flow paths. One path is through the jacket of the main combustion chamber, where the hydrogen is used to cool the chamber walls. It is then routed from the main combustion chamber to the LPFTP, where it is used to drive the LPFTP turbine. A small portion of the flow from the LPFTP is then directed to a common manifold from all three engines to form a single path to the liquid hydrogen tank to maintain pressurization. The remaining hydrogen passes between the inner and outer walls of the hot-gas manifold to cool it and is then discharged into the main combustion chamber. A second hydrogen flow path from the main fuel valve is through the engine nozzle (to cool the nozzle). It then joins the third flow path from the chamber coolant valve. This combined flow is then directed to the fuel and oxidizer pre-burners.

Powerhead

Preburners

The oxidizer and fuel pre-burners are welded to the hot-gas manifold. The fuel and oxidizer enter the pre-burners and are mixed so that efficient combustion can occur. The augmented spark igniter is a small combination chamber located in the center of the injector of each pre-burner. Two dual-redundant spark igniters are activated by the engine controller and are used during the engine start sequence to initiate combustion in each pre-burner. They are turned off after approximately three seconds because the combustion process is then self-sustaining. The pre-burners produce the fuel-rich hot gases that pass through the turbines to generate the power needed to operate the high-pressure turbopumps. The oxidizer pre-burner's outflow drives a turbine that is connected to the HPOTP and to the oxidizer pre-burner pump. The fuel pre-burner's outflow drives a turbine that is connected to the HPFTP.

The speed of the HPOTP and HPFTP turbines depends on the position of the corresponding oxidizer and fuel pre-burner oxidizer valves. These valves are positioned by the engine controller, which uses them to throttle the flow of liquid oxygen to the pre-burners and, thus, control engine thrust. The oxidizer and fuel pre-burner oxidizer valves increase or decrease the liquid oxygen flow, thus increasing or decreasing pre-burner chamber pressure, HPOTP and HPFTP turbine speed, and liquid oxygen and gaseous hydrogen flow into the main combustion chamber, which increases or decreases engine thrust. The oxidizer and fuel pre-burner valves operate together to throttle the engine and maintain a constant 6.03:1 propellant mixture ratio.

The main oxidizer and main fuel valves control the flow of liquid oxygen and liquid hydrogen into the engine and are controlled by each engine controller. When an engine is operating, the main valves are fully open.

Main combustion chamber
The engine's main combustion chamber (MCC) receives fuel-rich hot gas from a hot-gas manifold cooling circuit. The gaseous hydrogen and liquid oxygen enter the chamber at the injector, which mixes the propellants. The mixture is ignited by the "Augmented Spark Igniter", an H/O flame at the center of the injector head. The main injector and dome assembly are welded to the hot-gas manifold, and the MCC is also bolted to the hot-gas manifold. The MCC comprises a structural shell made of Inconel 718 which is lined with a copper-silver-zirconium alloy called NARloy-Z, developed specifically for the RS-25 in the 1970s. Around 390 channels are machined into the liner wall to carry liquid hydrogen through the liner to provide MCC cooling, as the temperature in the combustion chamber reaches 3300 °C (6000 °F) during flight – higher than the boiling point of iron.

An alternative for the construction of RS-25 engines to be used in SLS missions is the use of advanced structural ceramics, such as thermal barrier coatings (TBCs) and ceramic-matrix composites (CMCs). These materials possess significantly lower thermal conductivities than metallic alloys, thus allowing more efficient combustion and reducing the cooling requirements. TBCs are thin ceramic oxide layers deposited on metallic components, acting as a thermal barrier between hot gaseous combustion products and the metallic shell. A TBC applied to the Inconel 718 shell during production could extend engine life and reduce cooling costs. Further, CMCs have been studied as a replacement for Ni-based superalloys and are composed of high-strength fibers (BN, C) continuously dispersed in a SiC matrix. An MCC composed of a CMC, though less studied and farther from fruition than the application of a TBC, could offer unprecedented levels of engine efficiency.

Nozzle

The nozzle is a bell-shaped extension bolted to the main combustion chamber, referred to as a de Laval nozzle. The RS-25 nozzle has an unusually large expansion ratio (about 69:1) for the chamber pressure. At sea level, a nozzle of this ratio would normally undergo flow separation of the jet from the nozzle, which would cause control difficulties and could even mechanically damage the vehicle. However, to aid the engine's operation  Rocketdyne engineers varied the angle of the nozzle walls from the theoretical optimum for thrust, reducing it near the exit. The inner surface of each nozzle is cooled by liquid hydrogen flowing through brazed stainless steel tube wall coolant passages. On the Space Shuttle, a support ring welded to the forward end of the nozzle is the engine attach point to the orbiter-supplied heat shield. Thermal protection is necessary because of the exposure portions of the nozzles experience during the launch, ascent, on-orbit and entry phases of a mission. The insulation consists of four layers of metallic batting covered with a metallic foil and screening.

Controller

Each engine is equipped with a main engine controller (MEC), an integrated computer which controls all of the engine's functions (through the use of valves) and monitors its performance. Built by Honeywell Aerospace, each MEC originally comprised two redundant Honeywell HDC-601 computers, later upgraded to a system composed of two doubly redundant Motorola 68000 (M68000) processors (for a total of four M68000s per controller). Having the controller installed on the engine itself greatly simplifies the wiring between the engine and the launch vehicle, because all the sensors and actuators are connected directly to only the controller, each MEC then being connected to the orbiter's general purpose computers (GPCs) or the SLS's avionics suite via its own engine interface unit (EIU). Using a dedicated system also simplifies the software and thus improves its reliability.

Two independent dual-CPU computers, A and B, form the controller; giving redundancy to the system. The failure of controller system A automatically leads to a switch-over to controller system B without impeding operational capabilities; the subsequent failure of controller system B would provide a graceful shutdown of the engine. Within each system (A and B), the two M68000s operate in lock-step, thereby enabling each system to detect failures by comparing the signal levels on the buses of the two M68000 processors within that system. If differences are encountered between the two buses, then an interrupt is generated and control turned over to the other system. Because of subtle differences between M68000s from Motorola and the second source manufacturer TRW, each system uses M68000s from the same manufacturer (for instance system A would have two Motorola CPUs while system B would have two CPUs manufactured by TRW). Memory for block I controllers was of the plated-wire type, which functions in a manner similar to magnetic core memory and retains data even after power is turned off. Block II controllers used conventional CMOS static RAM.

The controllers were designed to be tough enough to survive the forces of launch and proved to be extremely resilient to damage. During the investigation of the Challenger accident the two MECs (from engines 2020 and 2021), recovered from the seafloor, were delivered to Honeywell Aerospace for examination and analysis. One controller was broken open on one side, and both were severely corroded and damaged by marine life. Both units were disassembled and the memory units flushed with deionized water. After they were dried and vacuum baked, data from these units was retrieved for forensic examination.

Main valves
To control the engine's output, the MEC operates five hydraulically actuated propellant valves on each engine; the oxidizer pre-burner oxidizer, fuel pre-burner oxidizer, main oxidizer, main fuel, and chamber coolant valves. In an emergency, the valves can be fully closed by using the engine's helium supply system as a backup actuation system.

In the Space Shuttle, the main oxidizer and fuel bleed valves were used after shutdown to dump any residual propellant, with residual liquid oxygen venting through the engine and residual liquid hydrogen venting through the liquid hydrogen fill and drain valves. After the dump was completed, the valves closed and remained closed for the remainder of the mission.

A coolant control valve is mounted on the combustion chamber coolant bypass duct of each engine. The engine controller regulates the amount of gaseous hydrogen allowed to bypass the nozzle coolant loop, thus controlling its temperature. The chamber coolant valve is 100% open before the engine start. During engine operation, it is 100% open for throttle settings of 100 to 109%. For throttle settings between 65 and 100%, its position ranged from 66.4 to 100%.

Gimbal

Each engine is installed with a gimbal bearing, a universal ball and socket joint which is bolted to the launch vehicle by its upper flange and to the engine by its lower flange. As well as providing a means to attach the engine to the launch vehicle, the gimbal bearing allows the engine to be pivoted (or "gimballed") around two axes of freedom with a range of ±10.5°. This motion allows the engine's thrust vector to be altered, thus steering the vehicle into the correct orientation. The comparatively large gimbal range is necessary to correct for the pitch momentum that occurs due to the constantly shifting center of mass as the vehicle burns fuel in flight and after booster separation.

The low-pressure oxygen and low-pressure fuel turbopumps were mounted 180° apart on the orbiter's aft fuselage thrust structure. The lines from the low-pressure turbopumps to the high-pressure turbopumps contain flexible bellows that enable the low-pressure turbopumps to remain stationary while the rest of the engine is gimbaled for thrust vector control, and also to prevent damage to the pumps when loads were applied to them. The liquid-hydrogen line from the LPFTP to the HPFTP is insulated to prevent the formation of liquid air.

Helium system
In addition to fuel and oxidizer systems, the launch vehicle's main propulsion system is also equipped with a helium system consisting of ten storage tanks in addition to various regulators, check valves, distribution lines, and control valves. The system is used in-flight to purge the engine and provides pressure for actuating engine valves within the propellant management system and during emergency shutdowns. During entry, on the Space Shuttle, any remaining helium was used to purge the engines during reentry and for repressurization.

History

Development

The history of the RS-25 traces back to the 1960s when NASA's Marshall Space Flight Center and Rocketdyne were conducting a series of studies on high-pressure engines, developed from the successful J-2 engine used on the S-II and S-IVB upper stages of the Saturn V rocket during the Apollo program. The studies were conducted under a program to upgrade the Saturn V engines, which produced a design for a  upper-stage engine known as the HG-3. As funding levels for Apollo wound down the HG-3 was cancelled as well as the upgraded F-1 engines already being tested. It was the design for the HG-3 that would form the basis for the RS-25.

Meanwhile, in 1967, the US Air Force funded a study into advanced rocket propulsion systems for use during Project Isinglass, with Rocketdyne asked to investigate aerospike engines and Pratt & Whitney (P&W) to research more efficient conventional de Laval nozzle-type engines. At the conclusion of the study, P&W put forward a proposal for a 250,000 lbf engine called the XLR-129, which used a two-position expanding nozzle to provide increased efficiency over a wide range of altitudes.

In January 1969 NASA awarded contracts to General Dynamics, Lockheed, McDonnell Douglas, and North American Rockwell to initiate the early development of the Space Shuttle. As part of these 'Phase A' studies, the involved companies selected an upgraded version of the XLR-129, developing , as the baseline engine for their designs. This design can be found on many of the planned Shuttle versions right up to the final decision. However, since NASA was interested in pushing the state of the art in every way they decided to select a much more advanced design in order to "force an advancement of rocket engine technology".

Development began in 1970, when NASA released a request for proposal for 'Phase B' main engine concept studies, requiring development of a throttleable, staged combustion, de Laval-type engine. The request was based on the then-current design of the Space Shuttle which featured two reusable stages, the orbiter and a crewed fly-back booster, and required one engine which would be able to power both vehicles via two different nozzles (12 booster engines with  sea level thrust each and 3 orbiter engines with  vacuum thrust each). Rocketdyne, P&W and Aerojet General were selected to receive funding although, given P&W's already-advanced development (demonstrating a working  concept engine during the year) and Aerojet General's prior experience in developing the  M-1 engine, Rocketdyne was forced to put a large amount of private money into the design process to allow the company to catch up to its competitors.

By the time the contract was awarded, budgetary pressures meant that the shuttle's design had changed to its final orbiter, external tank, and two boosters configuration, and so the engine was only required to power the orbiter during ascent. During the year-long 'Phase B' study period, Rocketdyne was able to make use of their experience developing the HG-3 engine to design their SSME proposal, producing a prototype by January 1971. The three participating companies submitted their engine development bids in April 1971, with Rocketdyne being awarded the contract on July 13, 1971—although work did not begin on engine development until March 31, 1972, due to a legal challenge from P&W.

Following the awarding of the contract, a preliminary design review was carried out in September 1972, followed by a critical design review in September 1976 after which the engine's design was set and construction of the first set of flight-capable engines began. A final review of all the Space Shuttle's components, including the engines, was conducted in 1979. The design reviews operated in parallel with several test milestones, initial tests consisting of individual engine components which identified shortcomings with various areas of the design, including the HPFTP, HPOTP, valves, nozzle, and fuel pre-burners. The individual engine component tests were followed by the first test of a complete engine (0002) on March 16, 1977. NASA specified that, prior to the Shuttle's first flight, the engines must have undergone at least 65,000 seconds of testing, a milestone that was reached on March 23, 1980, with the engine having undergone 110,253 seconds of testing by the time of STS-1 both on test stands at Stennis Space Center and installed on the Main Propulsion Test Article (MPTA). The engines, which were of the first manned orbital flight (FMOF) configuration and certified for operation at 100% rated power level (RPL), were operated in a twenty-second flight readiness firing on February 20, 1981, and, after inspection, declared ready for flight.

Space Shuttle program

Each Space Shuttle had three RS-25 engines, installed in the aft structure of the Space Shuttle orbiter in the Orbiter Processing Facility prior to the orbiter being transferred to the Vehicle Assembly Building. If necessary the engines could be changed on the pad. The engines, drawing propellant from the Space Shuttle external tank (ET) via the orbiter's main propulsion system (MPS), were ignited at T−6.6 seconds prior to liftoff (with each ignition staggered by 120 ms), which allowed their performance to be checked prior to ignition of the Space Shuttle Solid Rocket Boosters (SRBs), which committed the shuttle to the launch. At launch, the engines would be operating at 100% RPL, throttling up to 104.5% immediately following liftoff. The engines would maintain this power level until around T+40 seconds, where they would be throttled back to around 70% to reduce aerodynamic loads on the shuttle stack as it passed through the region of maximum dynamic pressure, or max. q. The engines would then be throttled back up until around T+8 minutes, at which point they would be gradually throttled back down to 67% to prevent the stack exceeding 3 g of acceleration as it became progressively lighter due to propellant consumption. The engines were then shut down, a procedure known as main engine cutoff (MECO), at around T+8.5 minutes.

After each flight the engines would be removed from the orbiter and transferred to the Space Shuttle Main Engine Processing Facility (SSMEPF), where they would be inspected and refurbished in preparation for reuse on a subsequent flight. A total of 46 reusable RS-25 engines, each costing around US$40 million, were flown during the Space Shuttle program, with each new or overhauled engine entering the flight inventory requiring flight qualification on one of the test stands at Stennis Space Center prior to flight.

Upgrades

Over the course of the Space Shuttle program, the RS-25 went through a series of upgrades, including combustion chamber changes, improved welds and turbopump changes in an effort to improve the engine's performance and reliability and so reduce the amount of maintenance required after use. As a result, several versions of the RS-25 were used during the program:
FMOF (first manned orbital flight): Certified for 100% rated power level (RPL). Used for the orbital flight test missions STS-1 – STS-5 (engines 2005, 2006 and 2007).
Phase I: Used for missions STS-6 – STS-51-L, the Phase I engine offered increased service life and was certified for 104% RPL. Replaced by Phase II after the Challenger Disaster.
Phase II (RS-25A): First flown on STS-26, the Phase II engine offered a number of safety upgrades and was certified for 104% RPL & 109% full power level (FPL) in the event of a contingency.
Block I (RS-25B): First flown on STS-70, the Block I engines offered improved turbopumps featuring ceramic bearings, half as many rotating parts, and a new casting process reducing the number of welds. Block I improvements also included a new, two-duct powerhead (rather than the original design, which featured three ducts connected to the HPFTP and two to the HPOTP), which helped improve hot gas flow, and an improved engine heat exchanger.
Block IA (RS-25B): First flown on STS-73, the Block IA engine offered main injector improvements.
Block IIA (RS-25C): First flown on STS-89, the Block IIA engine was an interim model used whilst certain components of the Block II engine completed development. Changes included a new large throat main combustion chamber (which had originally been recommended by Rocketdyne in 1980), improved low-pressure turbopumps, and certification for 104.5% RPL to compensate for a  reduction in specific impulse (original plans called for the engine to be certified to 106% for heavy International Space Station payloads, but this was not required and would have reduced engine service life). A slightly modified version first flew on STS-96.
Block II (RS-25D): First flown on STS-104, the Block II upgrade included all of the Block IIA improvements plus a new high-pressure fuel turbopump. This model was ground-tested to 111% FPL in the event of a contingency abort, and certified for 109% FPL for use during an intact abort.

Engine throttle/output
The most obvious effects of the upgrades the RS-25 received through the Space Shuttle program were the improvements in engine throttle. Whilst the FMOF engine had a maximum output of 100% RPL, Block II engines could throttle as high as 109% or 111% in an emergency, with usual flight performance being 104.5%. These increases in throttle level made a significant difference to the thrust produced by the engine:

Specifying power levels over 100% may seem nonsensical, but there was a logic behind it. The 100% level does not mean the maximum physical power level attainable, rather it was a specification decided on during engine development—the expected rated power level. When later studies indicated the engine could operate safely at levels above 100%, these higher levels became standard. Maintaining the original relationship of power level to physical thrust helped reduce confusion, as it created an unvarying fixed relationship so that test data (or operational data from past or future missions) can be easily compared. If the power level was increased, and that new value was said to be 100%, then all previous data and documentation would either require changing or cross-checking against what physical thrust corresponded to 100% power level on that date. Engine power level affects engine reliability, with studies indicating the probability of an engine failure increasing rapidly with power levels over 104.5%, which was why power levels above 104.5% were retained for contingency use only.

Incidents

During the course of the Space Shuttle program, a total of 46 RS-25 engines were used (with one extra RS-25D being built but never used). During the 135 missions, for a total of 405 individual engine-missions, Pratt & Whitney Rocketdyne reports a 99.95% reliability rate, with the only in-flight SSME failure occurring during 's STS-51-F mission. The engines, however, did suffer from a number of pad failures (redundant set launch sequencer aborts, or RSLSs) and other issues during the course of the program:
STS-41-D  – No. 3 engine caused an RSLS shutdown at T−4 seconds due to loss of redundant control on main engine valve, stack rolled back and engine replaced.
STS-51-F  – No. 2 engine caused an RSLS shutdown at T−3 seconds due to a coolant valve malfunction.
STS-51-F  – No. 1 engine (2023) shutdown at T+5:43 due to faulty temperature sensors, leading to an abort to orbit (although the mission objectives and length were not compromised by the ATO).
STS-55  – No. 3 engine caused an RSLS shutdown at T−3 seconds due to a leak in its liquid-oxygen preburner check valve.
STS-51  – No. 2 engine caused an RSLS shut down at T−3 seconds due to a faulty hydrogen fuel sensor.
STS-68  – No. 3 engine (2032) caused an RSLS shutdown at T−1.9 seconds when a temperature sensor in its HPOTP exceeded its redline.
STS-93  – An Orbiter Project AC1 Phase A electrical wiring short occurred at T+5 seconds causing an under voltage which disqualified SSME1A and SSME3B controllers but required no engine shut down. In addition, a 0.1-inch diameter, 1-inch long gold-plated pin, used to plug an oxidizer post orifice (an inappropriate SSME corrective action eliminated from the fleet by redesign) came loose inside an engine's main injector and impacted the engine nozzle inner surface, rupturing three hydrogen cooling lines. The resulting three breaches caused a leak resulting in a premature engine shutdown, when four external tank LO sensors flashed dry resulting in low-level cutoff of the main engines and a slightly early main engine cut-off with a  underspeed, and an 8 nautical mile lower altitude.

Constellation 

During the period preceding final Space Shuttle retirement, various plans for the remaining engines were proposed, ranging from them all being kept by NASA, to them all being given away (or sold for US$400,000–800,000 each) to various institutions such as museums and universities. This policy followed changes to the planned configurations of the Constellation program's Ares V cargo-launch vehicle and Ares I crew-launch vehicle rockets, which had been planned to use the RS-25 in their first and second stages respectively. While these configurations had initially seemed worthwhile, as they would use then-current technology following the shuttle's retirement in 2010, the plan had several drawbacks:
The engines would not be reusable, as they would be permanently attached to the discarded stages.
Each engine would have to undergo a test firing prior to installation and launch, with refurbishment required following the test.
It would be expensive, time-consuming, and weight-intensive to convert the ground-started RS-25D to an air-started version for the Ares I second stage.

Following several design changes to the Ares I and Ares V rockets, the RS-25 was to be replaced with a single J-2X engine for the Ares I second stage and six modified RS-68 engines (which was based on both the SSME and Apollo-era J-2 engine) on the Ares V core stage; this meant that the RS-25 would be retired along with the space shuttle fleet. In 2010, however, NASA was directed to halt the Constellation program, and with it development of the Ares I and Ares V, instead of focusing on building a new heavy-lift launcher.

Space Launch System 

On 14 September 2011, following the retirement of the Space Shuttle, NASA announced that it would be developing a new launch vehicle, known as the Space Launch System (SLS), to replace the shuttle fleet. The design for the SLS features the RS-25 as part of its core stage, with different versions of the rocket being equipped with between three and five engines. The initial flights of the new launch vehicle will make use of previously flown Block II RS-25D engines, with NASA keeping such engines in a "purged safe" environment at Stennis Space Center, "along with all of the ground systems required to maintain them."

The SLS's propellants will be supplied to the engines from the rocket's core stage, which will consist of a modified Space Shuttle external tank with the MPS plumbing and engines at its aft, and an interstage structure at the top.

Once the remaining RS-25Ds are used up, they are to be replaced with a cheaper, expendable version, currently designated the RS-25E. This engine may be based on one or both of two single-use variants that were studied in 2005, the RS-25E (referred to as the Minimal Change Expendable SSME) and the even-more-simplified RS-25F (referred to as the Low Cost Manufacture Expendable SSME), both of which were under consideration in 2011 and are currently under development by Aerojet Rocketdyne.

On 1 May 2020, NASA awarded a contract extension to manufacture 18 additional RS-25 engines, with associated services, for $1.79 billion, bringing the total SLS contract value to almost $3.5 billion.

On 29 August 2022, Artemis 1 was delayed by a problem with engineering sensors on RS-25D #3 erroneously reporting that it hadn't chilled down to its ideal operating temperature.

On 16 November 2022, Artemis 1 launched from Kennedy Space Center Launch Complex 39B, the first time the RS-25 engine had flown since the Space Shuttle's final flight, STS-135, on 21 July 2011.

Engine tests 

In 2015, a test campaign was conducted to determine RS-25 engine performance with a new engine controller unit, under lower liquid-oxygen temperatures, with greater inlet pressure due to the taller SLS core-stage liquid-oxygen tank and higher vehicle acceleration; and with more nozzle heating due to the four-engine configuration and its position in-plane with the SLS booster exhaust nozzles. New ablative heat-shield insulation was to be tested as well. Tests occurred on January 9, May 28, June 11 (500 seconds), July 17 (535 seconds), August 13 and August 27.

Following these tests, four more engines were scheduled to enter a new test cycle. A new series of tests designed to evaluate performance in SLS-use cases was initiated in 2017.

On February 28, 2019, NASA conducted a 510-second test burn of a developmental RS-25 at 113 percent of its originally designed thrust for more than 430 seconds, about four times longer than any prior test at this thrust level.

On January 16, 2021, the RS-25 engines were fired again, during a hot-fire test as part of the Artemis program. The test was originally scheduled as an 8-minute test but was terminated at the 67th second due to intentionally conservative test parameters being breached in the hydraulic system of Engine 2's Core Stage Auxiliary Power Unit (CAPU) during the thrust vector control (TVC) system test. Engine 2's CAPU was shut down automatically, although if this issue had occurred during flight, it would not have caused an abort, as the remaining CAPUs are capable of powering the TVC systems of all four engines. The engine also suffered a different "Major Component Failure", in the engine control system, that was caused by instrumentation failure. This  have triggered an abort of the launch countdown during an actual launch attempt.

On March 18, 2021, the four RS-25 core-stage engines were once again fired as part of the second SLS core stage hot-fire test, which lasted the full duration of 500 seconds, successfully certifying the Artemis 1 core stage for flight.

On December 14, 2022, a single development RS-25E, serial number E10001, attempted a 500 second hot-fire test. The test aborted at T+209.5 seconds for unknown reasons.

XS-1 

On May 24, 2017, DARPA announced that they had selected The Boeing Company to complete design work on the XS-1 program. The technology demonstrator was planned to use an Aerojet Rocketdyne AR-22 engine. The AR-22 was a version of the RS-25, with parts sourced from Aerojet Rocketdyne and NASA inventories from early versions of the engine.  In July 2018 Aerojet Rocketdyne successfully completed ten 100-second firings of the AR-22 in ten days.

On January 22, 2020, Boeing announced that they were dropping out of the XS-1 program, leaving no role for the AR-22.

See also 
 Shuttle-C

Notes

References

External links 

Spherical panoramas of RS-25D in SSME Processing Facility prior to shipping to Stennis Space Center
Lawrence J. Thomson Collection, The University of Alabama in Huntsville Archives and Special Collections Files of Lawrence J. Thomson, chief engineer for the SSME from 1971 to 1986

Rocketdyne engines
Space Launch System
Articles containing video clips
Historic American Engineering Record in Texas
Rocket engines of the United States
Main Engine
Rocket engines using hydrogen propellant
Rocket engines using the staged combustion cycle